Concert etiquette refers to a set of social norms observed by those attending musical performances. These norms vary depending upon the type of music performance and can be stringent or informal.

Western classical music
At classical music concerts, the cardinal principle is to let others listen to the music undisturbed. Instruments and voices are typically unamplified, and the music is rich in detail and includes passages played very softly. Many audience members want to hear everything, and the normal standard of courtesy is simply to be entirely silent while the music is playing.  Thus, during this time experienced concertgoers avoid conversation, try to suppress coughs and sneezes until a loud passage arrives, and muffle these with handkerchiefs. Electronic devices are turned off. Concertgoers try to arrive and take seats before the music begins; late arrivals wait until a break between pieces allows seating by an usher.

Dress expectations for the audience are today rather informal in English-speaking countries. Audiences usually meet "smart casual" standards, with some performance companies explicitly telling audiences to wear whatever makes them comfortable. Hats are removed as they block others' view of the stage. Dress expectations may still be very formal for special events, events that are difficult to attend, or that take place in traditional venues. Additionally, concertgoers are expected to dress more formally in certain countries than in others.

Concert etiquette has, like the music, evolved over time. Late eighteenth-century composers such as Mozart expected that people would talk, particularly when audience members took dinner (which many had served during the performance), and took delight in audiences clapping at once in response to a nice musical effect. Individual movements were encored in response to audience applause.

The nineteenth century brought a shift in venue from aristocratic gatherings to public concerts along with works featuring an unprecedentedly wide dynamic range. Mahler clamped down on claques paid to applaud a particular performer, and specified in the score of his Kindertotenlieder that its movements should not be punctuated by applause. Wagner discouraged what he considered distracting noises from his audience at Bayreuth in 1882.

With the arrival of recording technology in the twentieth century, applause between the movements of a symphony or suite came to be regarded as a distraction from the momentum and unity of a work. Today it is usually considered something of a faux pas, though a minor and well-meaning one.

Sometimes it is the purpose of the conductor to maintain a fairly long silence after the last notes of a piece; this is an especially likely choice for pieces with quiet endings. The audience can be signaled not to applaud immediately through the device of the conductor keeping their hands lifted (as if still leading the orchestra), then lowering them when the intended silence is over. Thus in a way the conductor is "conducting the audience" as part of a performance ritual. Such efforts are usually heeded, at least by experienced audiences.

Sacred works offered as worship are not applauded. Such works include settings of requiem, Passion, mass, or Kaddish prayer. Presented in an artistic context, such works, along with secular works of comparable gravity, still often get respectful silence for a long moment before any applause.

In opera a particularly impressive aria will often be applauded, even if the music is continuing. Shouting is generally acceptable only during applause. The word shouted is often the Italian word bravo or a variation (brava in the case of a female performer, bravi for a plural number of performers, bravissimo for a truly exceptional performance). The word's original meaning is  "skillful" and it has come to mean "well done". The French word encore ("again") may be shouted as a request for more, although in Italy and France itself bis ("twice") is the more usual expression. In some cultures (e.g., Britain) enthusiastic approval can also be expressed by whistling, though in others (e.g., Italy, Russia) whistling can signify disapproval and act as the equivalent of booing.

Collapses of decorum have occurred often in music history. In 1861 a Paris performance of Richard Wagner's opera Tannhäuser was deliberately sabotaged by audience members bringing noisemakers. The premiere of Stravinsky's ballet The Rite of Spring in 1913 prompted catcalls and whistles from the crowd that degenerated into fistfights in the aisles and police intervention. Steve Reich's Four Organs at Carnegie Hall in 1973 featured audience members sarcastically applauding and shouting to hasten the end of the performance. Conductor Michael Tilson Thomas recalls a woman walking down the aisle and beating her head against the front of the stage, wailing "Stop, stop! I confess!"

Rock and metal music
Rock music and related genres are performed with amplified instruments, often at very loud volume, and tend to be dynamically more uniform than classical music. Thus sounds made by the audience are far less damaging to the musical enjoyment of others and are far more tolerated. At concerts of hard rock, punk or heavy metal, a mosh pit will often form in front of the stage, in which slam-dancing and the like may be performed, usually in an atmosphere of lively camaraderie and mutual assistance. 'Moshers' who have fallen are to be helped up immediately to avoid the risk of trampling, while found pieces of clothing, keys, cell phones, and other such items should be held aloft to be reclaimed. Audience members who are familiar with the lyrics of a given song typically sing along, especially during the chorus of the songs.

Requirements for attire are generally very lax. Blue jeans, shorts, and skirts are common attire, and sandals, sneakers, or boots are standard footwear (conventional high heels are generally unsafe for moshing or at outdoor venues with dirt flooring, though wide-heeled boots may be worn).  Male (and sometimes female) moshers are frequently shirtless, but total nudity is frowned upon. At heavy metal concerts in particular, dark clothing and items such as chains, studded belts and bracelets, and various leather garments are common (this can vary greatly between different styles of metal).

Heavy metal concerts also usually include head banging, mosh pits, fist pumping, stage diving, and crowd surfing. As many rock and metal concerts are held in standing room only clubs and concert halls, it is sometimes considered an insult to the band to sit during performances, particularly in heavy metal. Even in venues that provide seating, generally the audience will stand for the band's performance.

Sometimes at rock concerts, lighters are held or waved in the air to signal an encore or a power ballad. With the decline of smokers, the restrictions placed on carrying lighters during air travel, and the increase of cell phones in the early 21st century, cell phones (specifically the camera flash) are often used in place of lighters, and as a way to take personal pictures and videos. While this is frowned upon by some fans, cell phone use is fairly commonplace at concerts. Several artists, such as Björk, Prince, Neutral Milk Hotel, and Jack White have requested that audience members refrain from using their cell phones during their concerts.

Jazz music
Jazz music is performed in many different settings and venues throughout the world. When jazz is performed in public places such as outdoor jazz festivals and indoor jazz clubs, quiet conversation is usually considered acceptable. When attending a jazz performance in an indoor concert setting, western classical concert etiquette is expected with one exception: it is considered well-mannered to applaud after each artist has completed their extended improvised solo. Other vocalisations during the performance, offered as reactions to improvised phrases, are also acceptable.

See also
Etiquette 
Norm (sociology)
Gottfried van Swieten - an 18th-century pioneer of modern forms of classical music concert etiquette

References

External links
Opera protocol
Guide des difficultés de rédaction en musique (GDRM): Étiquette du concert (musiciens, public), in French

Etiquette by situation
Musical culture